Benjamin Burr (April 8, 1818 – February 16, 1894) was an American businessman and politician.

Biography
Benjamin Burr was born in Rodman, Jefferson County, New York on April 8, 1818. He grew up on a farm, and moved to Rochester, New York as a young man. He had a business there, Spencer & Burr, which dealt with wholesale oysters and fruit. He married Eliza Emmons in 1847, and they had one child together.

In 1857, Burr and his wife moved to Stevens Point, Wisconsin. He was in the mercantile and grocery business there, and was president of the International Bank of Amherst. He served as chairman of the Portage County Board of Supervisors, was a member of the Stevens Point Common Council, and was elected to the school board, for which he was the clerk. In 1868, Burr served in the Wisconsin State Assembly as a Democrat.

Burr died of pneumonia at his home in Stevens Point on February 17, 1894.

References

People from Jefferson County, New York
Politicians from Rochester, New York
People from Stevens Point, Wisconsin
Businesspeople from Rochester, New York
Businesspeople from Wisconsin
Farmers from New York (state)
County supervisors in Wisconsin
School board members in Wisconsin
Wisconsin city council members
1818 births
1894 deaths
Deaths from pneumonia in Wisconsin
19th-century American politicians
Democratic Party members of the Wisconsin State Assembly